Far Harbor is an American independent drama film written and directed by John Huddles (in his directing debut) and starring Edward Atterton, Jennifer Connelly, Dan Futterman, Marcia Gay Harden, Andrew Lauren, George Newbern, Tracee Ellis Ross and Jim True-Frost. It follows a group of seven young people who spend a weekend in the home of a wealthy yuppie on Long Island. Originally titled Mr. Spielberg's Boat, the title was changed after Steven Spielberg refused permission to use his name. The film serviced as a screen debut for model-turned-actress Tracee Ellis Ross. The Castle Hill Productions  film was premiered on November 22, 1996.

Cast
 Edward Atterton as Frick
 Jennifer Connelly as Ellie
 Dan Futterman as Brad
 Marcia Gay Harden as Arabella
 Andrew Lauren as Trey
 George Newbern as Jordan
 Tracee Ellis Ross as Kiki
 Jim True-Frost as Ryland

References

External links

 
 
 

1996 directorial debut films
1996 drama films
1996 films
1996 independent films
1990s American films
American independent films
Films set in New York City